Juan Junqueras i Baguñà (1900 – 30 September 1938) was a Spanish sprinter. He competed in three events at the 1924 Summer Olympics. He also competed in the hockey event at the 1928 Summer Olympics.

References

External links
 

1900 births
1938 deaths
Athletes (track and field) at the 1924 Summer Olympics
Field hockey players at the 1928 Summer Olympics
Spanish male field hockey players
Spanish male sprinters
Olympic athletes of Spain
Olympic field hockey players of Spain
Athletes from Barcelona